Coto River may refer to:

Coto Brus River
Coto Colorado River